|}

This is a list of results for the Legislative Council at the 2002 South Australian state election.

Continuing members 

The following MLCs were not up for re-election this year.

 Terry Cameron was elected in 1997 as a Labor MLC, but quit the party in 1999 and founded his own party, SA First.

Election results

See also
 Candidates of the 2002 South Australian state election
 Members of the South Australian Legislative Council, 2002–2006

References

2002
2002 elections in Australia
2000s in South Australia